Chung Ching Middle School is a private school in Seria, Brunei Darussalam. It has two schools not far from each other which separates Primary Section and Secondary/Kindergarten Section.

History

1930s-1940s 
Ching Chung Middle School began raising funds for the planning of the new school in 1937. The funds proved quite successful, so CCMS's Primary Section was formed not long in 1938. The school is made out of wood, sticks and hay. School staff consists of 1 headmaster, 1 teacher and 27 students. By 1939, the school has 2 teachers and over 50 students. In 1940, the school had over 100 students and 4 classrooms but it soon be destroyed by the Imperial Japanese in 1941. The Second World War ended in 1945 and the school was reformed by the board of directors and rebuilt with addition of 4 primary classes. The first group photo of the school staffs and 9 graduates was taken on 15 June 1949.

1950s-1960s 
Primary school had been moved to an existing location after it was completed in 1953. 1954, lower secondary was formed and school was renamed to the name as we all know, “Chung Ching Middle School”. Upper secondary was also later formed in 1957 with alongside 1000 students. On 4 September 1960, Secondary school building was declared open by the Deputy for His Majesty the Sultan dan Yang Di-Pertuan of Negara Brunei Darussalam.

1980s-2000s 

The Sultan Hassanal Bolkiah visited Chung Ching Middle School for the first time on 9 December 1986. On 11 August 2003, His Majesty made a surprised visit to CCMS which marks his second time visiting. In 2009, His Majesty visited the CCMS’ Gallery inside the International Convention Centre (ICC), Brunei.

2010s 
In 2012, Board of Directors and school staffs guides His Majesty around the school during his visit for the third time. Principal Ang Sik Liong received anti-epidemic supplies from private enterprises during the COVID-19 pandemic on 9 April 2020.

See also 
 List of schools in Brunei 
 Seria
 Education in Brunei

References

Further reading 

Primary schools in Brunei
Private schools in Brunei
1937 establishments in Brunei
Educational institutions established in 1937
Belait District